Wagner Township may refer to the following townships in the United States:

 Wagner Township, Clayton County, Iowa
 Wagner Township, Aitkin County, Minnesota